The Devils–Rangers rivalry (also known as the Hudson River rivalry or the Battle of the Hudson River), is an ice hockey rivalry between the New Jersey Devils and the New York Rangers clubs of the National Hockey League (NHL). The two teams are called "cross-river rivals." This is because Madison Square Garden in Midtown Manhattan, where the Rangers play, is across the Hudson River and less than 10 miles from the Prudential Center in downtown Newark (and previously, the Meadowlands Arena in East Rutherford), the home of the Devils. Travel between both arenas is easily accomplished by both road (usually through the Lincoln Tunnel) and rail (along the Northeast Corridor and PATH).

The Devils and Rangers are two of the three teams that play in the New York City metropolitan area, the other being the New York Islanders. All three teams have fierce, bitter rivalries with each other, as well as with the other (now formerly) Atlantic Division teams, the Philadelphia Flyers and Pittsburgh Penguins.

History

Early history
The rivalry began in 1982 when the Colorado Rockies moved to New Jersey to become the Devils. For the relocation, they were required to pay massive indemnities to the Rangers, New York Islanders and Philadelphia Flyers, geographically-proximate teams, for the right to share New Jersey market. For over 35 years, fans of both the Rangers and Devils have seen the best out of both their clubs whenever they meet. Despite the Devils' overall Stanley Cup playoff superiority since the 1990s, the first three playoff series between these teams were all Rangers victories. Their first playoff meeting occurred during the 1992 Stanley Cup playoffs, when the Presidents' Trophy-winning Rangers survived a seven-game Patrick Division Semifinals series with the Devils.

Stanley Cup championships of 1994 and 1995

1994: Rangers win Stanley Cup
Although both teams were the top point-getters in the NHL during the Rangers' championship season of 1993–94 (the Presidents' Trophy-winning Rangers netting 112 and the Devils notching 106), the story entering the Eastern Conference Finals was the Rangers' 6–0 record against New Jersey that regular season. In the final weeks of the regular season, the Devils were chasing the Rangers for the best record in the NHL. In response, the New York news media pushed Rangers Head Coach Mike Keenan to push the Rangers to winning the Presidents' Trophy as the League's top regular season team. Keenan replied, "I want to play Game 7 of the Stanley Cup (Finals) in Madison Square Garden." The Rangers reached the Conference Finals with relative ease by sweeping their crosstown rivals, the Islanders, and beating the Washington Capitals in five games. In comparison, the Devils' road was much harder, as they needed all seven games to oust the Buffalo Sabres in the first round and needed six games to eliminate the Boston Bruins in the Conference Semifinals.

However, all ideas of a quick New York series were soon ended after Game 1, a 4–3 double overtime victory that was sealed by the Devils' Stephane Richer. The Rangers responded by routing the Devils 4–0 in Game 2, and used a double overtime goal by Stephane Matteau to take a 2–1 lead after Game 3. After being routed in Games 4 and 5, the Rangers faced elimination in New Jersey for Game 6, with the Devils attempting to make the Stanley Cup Finals for the first time in franchise history. Prior to the game, Rangers captain Mark Messier guaranteed a victory in Game 6 at the Meadowlands; with the Rangers down 2–0 to the Devils, Messier scored a hat-trick to tie the series at 3–3 and send it back to New York for the deciding Game 7. In Game 7, the Devils' Valeri Zelepukin tied the game with 7.7 seconds left in regulation, but thanks to another Stephane Matteau goal in double overtime, the Rangers won the series and ultimately went on to win the Stanley Cup over the Vancouver Canucks, also in seven games. The first six games were won by the team that lost that respective game in 1992. That trend, however, was reversed when the Rangers won Game 7 in 1994.

1995: Devils win Stanley Cup
The Devils recovered from the crushing defeat to the Rangers in 1994 to win the Stanley Cup the following year in a shocking and improbable sweep of the Detroit Red Wings, though they had to go through another of their own rivals (also a great rival of the Rangers) in that year's Eastern Conference Finals, the Philadelphia Flyers, who had eliminated the Rangers in the second round, making the rivalry during the  showdowns between the Stanley Cup champions of the previous two seasons.

When both teams won the Stanley Cup in their respective seasons, the Stanley Cup was awarded on their side of the Hudson River (Rangers won at Madison Square Garden in 1994, the Devils at the Meadowlands in 1995). The Devils did not have home ice advantage during their Finals. In fact, they were the first team to win the Stanley Cup without having home ice advantage in any of the four rounds of the playoffs.

1997 playoffs
The third Devils–Rangers playoff series occurred just three years later. The Rangers, led by Mark Messier, Wayne Gretzky, Brian Leetch, and Mike Richter, eliminated the Devils in the 1997 Eastern Conference Semifinals, winning four games in a row after losing Game 1. In game 5, Adam Graves scored an overtime wraparound goal to give the Rangers the series win. New Jersey was limited to just five goals in the five-game series, including two shutout losses.

1998–2006
From the start of 1998, however, rivalry momentum began to shift in favor of the Devils. New Jersey dominated New York during the regular season in the late 1990s and early 2000s. At one point, the Devils had an unbeaten streak against the Rangers throughout 23 regular season games going 15–0–8, starting on February 17, 1997, and ending March 31, 2001, an undefeated streak spanning four years.

Meanwhile, the Rangers had the division lead for most of the latter part of the season but lost their final five games as the season came to a close. The Devils took the Division title away from the Rangers by ending the season with one more point than New York. As fate would have it, the white-hot Devils met the Rangers in their fourth playoff meeting in the 2006 Eastern Conference Quarterfinals. The result was a four-game sweep by New Jersey over their cross-river rivals for the first time ever in franchise history.

2007–2011

Two years later, the teams would meet yet again in the playoffs for the fifth time, in the 2008 Eastern Conference Quarterfinals. Gomez responded by scoring three assists in Game 1 and two goals in Game 4 against his former team en route to a Rangers series win. In Game 3, Ranger Sean Avery used a tactic to screen opposing goaltender Martin Brodeur. While essentially ignoring the play on the ice when his team had a two-man advantage, Avery faced Brodeur and waved his hands and stick in front of him in an attempt to distract him and block his view. Although not illegal, many NHL commentators and players described Avery's actions as inappropriate. The following day, the NHL issued an interpretation of the league's unsportsmanlike conduct rule to cover actions such as the one employed by Avery. Following the Rangers victory in Game 5 of the series during the hand-shake line, Brodeur shook the hand of every Ranger except Avery. When asked what happened after the game, Avery said, "Well, everyone talks about how classy or un-classy I am, and fatso [Brodeur] there just forgot to shake my hand I guess. . . We outplayed him. I outplayed him. We’re going to the second round." That year in the regular season, Avery slid into Brodeur. Brodeur retaliated by shoving Avery, who shoved back and a brawl occurred.

However, the rivalry was revived because both head coaches, the Rangers' John Tortorella and the Devils' Jacques Lemaire, were on different team's benches — Tortorella was an assistant coach for the Americans, while Lemaire was with Team Canada, which ultimately took home gold over the U.S.

Hours after the Rangers beat the Devils 5–2 in their last game of the regular season on April 9, the Tampa Bay Lightning beat the Carolina Hurricanes 6–2 to help the Rangers reach the 2011 playoffs. Both teams were in opposite directions during the season.

2012 Conference Finals: "The Rematch"
For the previous six seasons, the teams had met at least once in October. In two of the first three meetings of the teams, there have been fights to start the game, which included the third game of the year, were two fights immediately broke-out after the first face-off. Also in the third game, there was a controversial call that negated a goal by the Rangers' Derek Stepan due to alleged goaltender interference by Marian Gaborik. Some argue that Gaborik was pushed into the goalie, Brodeur, by ex-Devil Anton Volchenkov, while others argue that the forward did not make an effort to avoid the goaltender, therefore legitimizing the penalty.

The Devils and Rangers met for their final contest of the season on March 19, 2012, at Madison Square Garden. Continuing the trend established in prior games, the game began with three simultaneous fights, and the Rangers went on to win the game, 4–2. With the Devils defeating rival Philadelphia in five games, and the Rangers defeating Washington in seven, the stage had been set for a rematch of the 1994 Eastern Conference Finals between the two in the Eastern Conference Finals. With the exception of Games 1 and 2, the remainder of the series was played on the 18th anniversary of each game of the 1994 Conference Finals series between the two, and the pattern of wins from Games 3 to 5 were identical to that of 1994. However, the Devils would eventually lose the Cup in six games to the Los Angeles Kings.

2012–present
The  began with a labor lockout due to the NHL Collective Bargaining Agreement (CBA)'s expiration, with the players and owners struggling to agree on new terms. Although the League's All-Star Game, Winter Classic and almost half of the regular season was lost due to work stoppage, the parties finally agreed to new terms in early 2013 to begin the season in late January. New Jersey won the first game between the two teams, though the Rangers won the remaining three. The Rangers' 4–1 victory on April 21 at home officially ended the Devils' hopes to reach the playoffs that season, despite making the Finals the previous year.

After taking a 3–1 lead in the game, the Devils eventually imploded and lost the game 7–3. Throughout the season, New York won two out of five meetings between them that year, while the Devils missed the playoffs for the second year in a row, which had not happened since 1987. The Rangers, on the other hand, finally made it to the Finals, which they had not done since 1994. However, New York lost to the Los Angeles Kings, who won their second Cup in three seasons.

The first one was a come-from-behind, 4–3 road victory in overtime, while the second was a 3–1 win at the Garden, extending the team's win streak over New Jersey to six consecutive games.

On February 22, 2018, the two teams made their first trade together when the Rangers sent Michael Grabner to the Devils in exchange for Yegor Rykov and a second-round pick in the 2018 NHL Entry Draft.

In the draft lottery for the 2019 NHL Entry Draft, the Devils received the first, while the Rangers the second overall pick. The Devils selected Jack Hughes, while the Rangers selected Kaapo Kakko. This was seen as a new chapter in the rivalry between the teams.

Reaction

Fans on both sides have agreed the rivalry has become even stronger as of late, due in large part to the fact that both teams have shown much more parity towards each other. Many hockey analysts within the media have referred to them as "mirror teams" given their many similarities. Since the 2004–05 NHL lockout, the two teams have met a total of 43 times (as of March 25, 2010), including playoff games.

Many Rangers fans have been seen burning Devils memorabilia after Rangers' victories over the Devils, and lighting their cigarettes with it, while exiting Madison Square Garden. Devils fans, meanwhile, enjoy making confetti which reads "Rangers suck" and handing them out during games formerly at the Continental Airlines Arena and currently at the Prudential Center. The Devils' fans also have a cheer that is yelled and whistled at every game. In response to the "Let's go band"/"Potvin sucks" chant of Rangers fans against the Islanders, the Devils fans at the Prudential Center cheer "Rangers Suck" (and more recently immediately followed with, "Flyers Swallow"). This chant, just like the Potvin chant being heard whether the Rangers are playing the Islanders or not, is heard at every Devils' home game.

The Rangers–Devils rivalry is popular among fans due to its geographic proximity, which is seen as a battle between the neighboring states of New York and New Jersey. Travel ease allows fans to typically follow their respective team across the Hudson to view away games. Fans of both teams have also shown considerable hostility towards each other's goaltender. Rangers fans had often battered former Devils goaltender Martin Brodeur with sarcastic chants of "Marty! Marty! Marty!" after goals scored on him during games between the two teams. Conversely, Devils fans would chant "Henrik! Henrik! Henrik!" at former Rangers goaltender Henrik Lundqvist after the Devils scored on him.

Recently, there have been parting shots taken by players and media at each organization through written words. In Beyond the Crease, an autobiography written by Martin Brodeur, he writes, "I hate the Rangers, and Lou hates them to death." During their last playoff meet, actor/director Kevin Smith was asked to have a blog commenting on the series, which could be read on the NHL's official website. After Game 3, he wrote:

No Devils fan can truly pinpoint why we hate our cross-river rivals as much as we do. Even so, Devils fans live to hate the Rangers. Sometimes, it feels like a large cross-section of those folks in the stands at the Rock (and formerly at the Meadowlands) aren't there so much to love on the Devils as they are to hate on New York. Even when the boys in blue aren't anywhere near the building, we're still seething about their very existence. You'd think we'd hold a special place in our hearts for the Rangers, as they gave us our first ever win back in 1982. Granted, they don't roll over for us as much as Philly does (except, y'know – in that last game this season), but the Rangers've been hoisted up high on the Devils' pitchfork enough times (the '06 four-zip playoffs come to mind) to warrant at least a degree of affection right?

In popular culture
This rivalry was satirized in pop culture with the Seinfeld episode "The Face Painter" in which David Puddy, a hard-core Devils fan, paints his face red at a playoff game against the Rangers at the Garden, much to the embarrassment of Jerry, Kramer and Elaine.

The rivalry was also seen in the short-lived 2003 sitcom Whoopi, starring Whoopi Goldberg in the episode "Smoke Gets in Your Eyes", where it featured Devils stars Scott Gomez, Jay Pandolfo, and Scott Stevens. Rangers players that were featured on the show included Anson Carter and Darius Kasparitis.

See also
 National Hockey League rivalries
 Devils–Flyers rivalry
 Islanders–Rangers rivalry
 Hudson River Derby

Notes

References

History of the New Jersey Devils
History of the New York Rangers
National Hockey League in the New York metropolitan area
National Hockey League rivalries